The 17th Panzer Division was a formation of the Wehrmacht in World War II. It was formed in November 1940 from the 27th Infantry Division. It took part in Operation Barbarossa, the invasion of the Soviet Union in June 1941, and in the winter of 1941–42 participated in the Battle of Moscow. In November 1942, the division was sent to the southern sector of the Eastern Front where it participated in Operation Winter Storm, the failed attempt to relieve the surrounded troops at Stalingrad. The division was held in reserve during the Battle of Kursk in 1943, and thereafter retreated through Ukraine and Poland, before ending the war in Czechoslovakia.

Operational history

Formation
The 27th Infantry Division was formed in October 1936 in Augsburg, Bavaria, as a peacetime division of the new German Wehrmacht. The division was mobilised on 26 August 1939 and took part in the Invasion of Poland and the Battle of France. In 1943, a Nazi propaganda book was published about the division's actions in France 1940, titled Über Somme, Seine, Loire (English: Across the Somme, the Seine, the Loire).

The 17th Panzer Division was formed in late 1940, when the 27th Infantry Division was converted to an armored division. In part, the 2nd Panzer Division provided personnel for the new division. The majority of its troops came from the Bavarian region of Swabia, then the Nazi Gau Swabia

1941
In May 1941, the division was transferred to the central sector of the planned attack on the Soviet Union, Operation Barbarossa, and became part of the XXXXVII Panzer Corps, which in turn was part of the 2nd Panzer Group, commanded by Heinz Guderian. The division's commander, Hans-Jürgen von Arnim, was wounded within the first few days of the campaign, on 24 June, but later returned to his unit. His temporary replacement, Karl Ritter von Weber, was mortally wounded south of Smolensk on 17 July, putting Wilhelm Ritter von Thoma in charge until von Arnim returned.

The division crossed the Bug River and advanced south of Minsk, where it made contact with the 3rd Panzer Group. It took part in the Battle of Białystok–Minsk, where it recorded up to 100 Soviet tanks destroyed in a single day, 9 July, at Orsha.  It then crossed the river Dnjepr south of Orsha and took part in defensive operations south of Smolensk in August and September.

In October, it took part in the run up to the Battle of Moscow, taking Bryansk on 6 October. The division was then concentrated at Orel and advanced towards Tula, where it was engaged in a failed attempt to encircle the city. With the Soviet counterattack on 5 December, the division started retreating on the 8th, after having reached a point 120 km south east of Moscow. The division took defensive positions northeast of Orel, where it remained until the Summer of 1942.

1942

After the winter battles, the division was reconstituted near its front line positions in the early summer of 1942. It received approximately 50 tanks of the type Panzer III and Panzer IV.  It was engaged in minor attacks north of Orel in September but then went into  defensive positions again. The division was then held in Army Group Centre reserve near Bolkhov. At this stage, it only fielded 45 to 50 tanks of varying types (down from a nominal strength of around 200). In October 1942, when Fridolin von Senger und Etterlin took command of the division, it had only 30 operational tanks, and one-third of its trucks were unserviceable.

After Operation Uranus, the Soviet counterattack at Stalingrad, the division was quickly transferred to Army Group B in the area of Millerovo. From there, it marched towards Kotelnikovo and joined the 4th Panzer Army for Operation Winter Storm, a relief operation aimed at linking up with the encircled 6th Army, together with the 6th Panzer Division and the 23rd Panzer Division. The operation failed however, and the division retreated at the end of December. Losses were so heavy that the command of the 63rd Panzer Grenadier Regiment laid in the hands of a lieutenant, its original commander having been killed in action. By Christmas Eve 1942, the division fielded only eight operational tanks and one anti-tank gun.

1943

The division continued its retreat towards the Don bridgehead at Rostov-on-Don, which it reached at the end of January. The 39th Panzer Regiment was re-equipped with 50 new Panzer IV tanks shortly after and the division took part in counterattacks between the Mius and the Donets rivers. By 27 February, the division had been reduced to less than 2,000 men, six tanks and ten anti-tank guns but avoided further destruction when the Soviet forces withdrew behind the Donets river. After this, it was engaged in tank battles near Belgorod until the end of April.

The division did not take part in the Battle of Kursk. Instead, it stayed in reserve, behind the front line, as part of the XXIV Panzer Corps. It took part in some successful counterattacks after the battle, in the Donets-Izium area. On 20 July, Generalleutnant Walter Schilling became the second division commander of the division  to be killed in action. In July, the division had the following strength in tanks, of which 84% were operational: 4 Panzer II; 29 Panzer III; 32 Panzer IV; 2 T-34. In September, the division retreated from the Donets to positions behind the Dnjepr river, taking up a defensive line on the western side of the river. Initially it was posted at Krivoi Rog, in November it moved to Kherson, as part of the re-formed 6th Army.

1944
In late January and early February 1944, the 17th Panzer Division took part in the relief operations for the Korsun-Cherkassy Pocket, as part of the III Panzer Corps. In the end, the involved German tank divisions were halted by the Red Army 12 km from the pocket but the troops inside broke out, abandoning their heavy equipment. It was then part of the 1st Panzer Army in the Kamenets-Podolsky pocket, where it lost most of its own heavy equipment, but escaped as a whole.

It remained in reserve again in April and May, stationed behind the frontline, before taking part in operations around Lviv to counter the Soviet Lvov–Sandomierz Offensive. Until the end of October, the unit took part in operations in the Tarnów region and then south of the Baranow bridgehead, near Sandomierz. From November, it became part of the reserves receiving 80 Panzer IV and Panzer V tanks (Panthers).

1945
With the start of the Soviet Vistula–Oder Offensive on 12 January 1945, the 17th Panzer Division, alongside the 16th Panzer Division were the main reserve forces in the sector, retained for a counterattack to the Soviet advance. Both divisions, stationed too close to the front line due to Hitlers restraining order, suffered heavy casualties through bombardment and had their communications destroyed. Their task, to throw back the Soviet advance, was impossible to achieve.

The division found itself in constant retreat as part of the XXIV Panzer Corps commanded by Walther Nehring, first towards Łódź, then crossing the Oder, where it took positions near Głogów in February. It took part in defensive operations near the Ścinawa (German: Steinau) bridgehead in mid-February. The division had suffered heavy losses during those events and was re-supplied near Görlitz, now renamed Kampfgruppe 17th Panzer Division due to being severely understrength and being no more in size than a regiment. It continued its defensive actions in the region during the Silesian Offensives. The division was eventually forced to retreat into Czechoslovakia, heading towards Brno.

In February 1945, the division, by now reduced to a Kampfgruppe, was attached to Army Group Center on the Oder River. By March 1945, it retreated as far as Jägerndorf by the Red Army. Early in April, it had retreated southwest into Moravia, where in quick succession it came under the order of 17th Army and 1st Army. The division surrendered to the Soviet army near Görlitz at the end of April 1945.

Commanders

Area of operations

Order of battle in 1944
The order of battle in 1944. The 63rd Panzergrenadier Regiment was disbanded in late 1944. The regiments first battalion replaced the third battalion of 40th Panzergrenadier Regiment. The second battalion of the 63rd Regiment became the second battalion of the 79th Panzer-Füsilier Regiment. The 297th Army Flak Battalion had only joined the division in 1943 and the Panzergrenadier Regiment had been called Schützen Regiment until July 1942.

HQ

Divisional Staff
Mapping Detachment (mot)
Military Police Detachment (mot)
Escort Company

39th Panzer Regiment

Regimental Staff
2 x Battalion
Panzer Maintenance Company

40th Panzergrenadier Regiment

Regimental Staff
3 x Battalion
Pioneer Company (mot)
Infantry Support Gun Company (self-propelled)
63rd Panzergrenadier Regiment.

27th Panzerjäger Battalion

Battalion Staff
Panzerjäger Battalion Staff Company
2 x Sturmgeschütz Company
Panzerjäger Company (mot)
Panzerjäger Supply Column (mot)

27th Panzer Reconnaissance Battalion

Battalion Staff
Battalion Staff Company
Luchs Reconnaissance Company
2 x Reconnaissance Company (half-track)
Heavy Reconnaissance Company (half-track)
Reconnaissance Supply Company (mot)

27th Panzer Artillery Regiment

Regimental Staff & Staff Battery
Battalion (self-propelled)
2 x Battalion (mot)

297th Army Flak Battalion

Battalion Staff & Staff Battery
2 x Heavy Flak Battery (mot)
Light Flak Battery (mot)

27th Panzer Signals Battalion

Signals Battalion Staff
Panzer Telephone Company
Panzer Radio Company
Signals Supply Company (mot)

27th Panzer Pioneer Battalion

Battalion Staff (half-track)
2 x Pioneer Company (mot)
Pioneer Company (half-track)
Support & Supply Units

References

Bibliography

External links
 

1*17
Military units and formations established in 1940
Military units and formations disestablished in 1945